Tomáš Malec (born 5 January 1993) is a Slovak professional footballer who plays as a striker.

Club career
He finished the 2013–14 Slovak First Football League as top scorer with 14 goals.
As of August 11, 2014 he went on loan to Rosenborg in Norway for the rest of the season. The agreement included an option for expanding the loan into a permanent transfer if agreed at the end of the current season

In 2018 season was player Žalgiris Vilnius. In 25 matches scored 8 goals. After season left team.

On 20 August 2019, he signed with Italian Serie C club Vis Pesaro.

On 11 August 2020 he signed with Senica.

National team
Malec was first called up to the senior national team for two unofficial friendly fixtures held in Abu Dhabi, UAE, in January 2017, against Uganda and Sweden. He made his debut against Uganda, being fielded from the start until the 70th minute, when he was substituted for Dávid Guba. Slovakia went on to lose the game 1–3. He also played the last thirty minutes of a 0–6 loss against Sweden, replacing Pavol Šafranko.

Career statistics

Honours

Individual
 Slovak First Football League Top Scorer: 2013-14
Norwegian Cup Top goalscorer: 2015

References

External links
 AS Trenčín profile
 
 Hmpsport.sk profile

Living people
1993 births
Sportspeople from Trenčín
Slovak footballers
Slovakia youth international footballers
Slovak expatriate footballers
Association football forwards
AS Trenčín players
MFK Tatran Liptovský Mikuláš players
Rosenborg BK players
SK Sigma Olomouc players
Lillestrøm SK players
FC DAC 1904 Dunajská Streda players
FK Žalgiris players
FK RFS players
Vis Pesaro dal 1898 players
FK Senica players
GKS Tychy players
Slovak Super Liga players
Eliteserien players
Czech First League players
A Lyga players
Latvian Higher League players
Serie C players
I liga players
Slovak expatriate sportspeople in Norway
Slovak expatriate sportspeople in the Czech Republic
Slovak expatriate sportspeople in Lithuania
Slovak expatriate sportspeople in Latvia
Slovak expatriate sportspeople in Italy
Slovak expatriate sportspeople in Poland
Expatriate footballers in Norway
Expatriate footballers in the Czech Republic
Expatriate footballers in Lithuania
Expatriate footballers in Latvia
Expatriate footballers in Italy
Expatriate footballers in Poland